The Montes de Maria Province is  a subregion of the Colombian Department of Bolívar and Sucre.

References 

Provinces of Bolívar Department